Dinesh(1937-1990) was an Indian actor in the Kannada film industry. Notably, he acted in Bhootayyana Maga Ayyu (1974), Golmaal Radhakrishna (1990), S. P. Sangliyana Part 2 (1990) and Seetharamu (1979).

Selected filmography

 Naandi (1964)...Gopal Rao
 Ide Mahasudina (1965)...Ranga
 Bettada Huli (1965)
 Kiladi Ranga (1966)
 Sri Kanyaka Parameshwari Kathe (1966)
 Bangarada Hoovu (1967)...Doctor
 Beedi Basavanna (1967)
 Gange Gowri (1967)
 Manassiddare Marga (1967)...Johnny
 Premakkoo Permitte (1967)
 Rajashekara (1967)
 Rajadurgada Rahasya (1967)
 Amma (1968)...Lingaraju
 Chinnari Puttanna (1968)
 Gandhinagara (1968)
 Hannele Chiguridaga (1968)...Keshava
 Jedara Bale(1968)
 Manku Dinne (1968)
 Mysore Tanga (1968)
 Rowdy Ranganna (1968)...Chikka
 Simha Swapna (1968)...Yugandhara
 Choori Chikkanna (1969)...Rajashekhar
 Gandondu Hennaru (1969)
 Makkale Manege Manikya (1969)
 Odahuttidavaru (1969)
 Suvarna Bhoomi(1969)
 Bhoopathi Ranga (1970)...Dharmashekhara Sathyamurthy
 C.I.D. Rajanna (1970)
 Karulina Kare (1970)...Raja / Soorappa
 Namma Mane (1970)...Giri
 Sri Krishnadevaraya (1970)...Achyuta Deva Raya
 Nyayave Devaru...Narasimha
 Pratidwani (1971)...Bhushan
 Sri Krishna Rukmini Satyabhama (1971)
 Swayamvara (1973)
 Triveni (1973)...Parameshwaraiah
 Kiladi Jodi (1978)...Somaiah
 Seetharamu (1979)
 Point Parimala (1980)
 Ranganayaki (1981)...Venkataramana Shetty
 Simhada Mari Sainya (1981)
 Jimmy Gallu (1982)
 Mullina Gulabi (1982)...Sarvesha
 Gandu Bherunda (1984)...Taggappa Sharanappa Menshinkayi
 Malaya Marutha (1986)
 Anthima Ghatta (1987)
 Poornachandra (1987)...Kuppaswamy Naidu
 Shanthi Nivasa (1988)
 Krishna Rukmini (1988)
 Anantana Avantara (1989)
 Hrudaya Geethe (1989)
 Kindari Jogi (1989)
 C.B.I. Shankar (1989)...Subramanya
 Golmaal Radhakrishna (1990)
 S. P. Sangliyana Part 2 (1990)
 Avatara Purusha (1991)
 Prana Snehitha (1993)

See also

List of people from Karnataka
Cinema of Karnataka
List of Indian film actors
Cinema of India

References

External links
 
 Dinesh on Miluji.info
 Dr. Rajkumar & Dinesh Kannada Movies list

Kannada people
Male actors in Kannada cinema
Indian male film actors
Male actors from Karnataka
20th-century Indian male actors
21st-century Indian male actors
1990 deaths
1937 births